Martha Griggs (born 18 June 1953) is a Canadian equestrian. She competed in two events at the 1984 Summer Olympics.

References

External links
 

1953 births
Living people
Canadian female equestrians
Olympic equestrians of Canada
Equestrians at the 1984 Summer Olympics
Sportspeople from Montreal